Barleycroft End is a hamlet  in Hertfordshire, England. It is in the civil parish of Furneux Pelham.

External links

Hamlets in Hertfordshire
East Hertfordshire District